Yukawamyia is a genus of midges in the family Cecidomyiidae. The one described species - Yukawamyia gratia - is found in the Palearctic realm.

References

Cecidomyiidae genera

Insects described in 1999
Taxa named by Boris Mamaev
Monotypic Diptera genera
Taxa named by Alexander I. Zaitzev